The 2009 USA Cycling Professional Tour is the third year of this elite men's professional road bicycle racing series organized by USA Cycling.

Christian Vande Velde (272 points) and the Garmin/Chipotle Pro Cycling Team (711 points) are the defending champion of the overall individual and team titles, respectively.

Events 
The 2009 USA Cycling Professional Tour consists of the following 13 one-day races and stage races:

References 

USA Cycling Professional Tour, 2009
USA
USA